Machiavellian (31 January 1987 – 27 June 2004) was an American-bred Thoroughbred racehorse and sire. In a racing career which lasted from August 1989 to August 1990 he ran seven times and won four races. He was the leading French two-year-old of 1989 when he was unbeaten in three races including the Group One Prix Morny and Prix de la Salamandre. He later became a highly successful sire of winners.

Background
Machiavellian was a bay horse sired by the outstanding American stallion Mr Prospector. Machiavellian's dam Coup de Folie produced several important winners including Coup de Genie (Prix Morny), Exit To Nowhere (Prix Jacques le Marois) and Hydro Calido (Prix d'Astarte).

Racing career
Machiavellian began his racing career by winning the Prix Yacowlef at Deauville on 3 August 1989. Seventeen days later he was moved up to Group One level to contest the Prix Morny over the same course and distance. Ridden by Freddy Head, he won by two lengths from Qirmazi. Three weeks later he was moved up in distance for the Prix de la Salamandre at Longchamp Racecourse over 1400m. He won the race by half a length from Qirmazi.

Machiavellian began his three-year-old season by winning the Prix Djebel, beating the sprinter Ron's Victory by two and a half lengths. At Newmarket Racecourse on 5 May, Machiavellian started 6/4 favourite for the 2000 Guineas. He finished second, beaten two lengths by Tirol. In the Irish 2000 Guineas two weeks later he finished fourth to Tirol. On his final start, he finished last of the five runners in the Prix Maurice de Gheest behind the English filly Dead Certain.

Stud career
Machiavellian was based throughout his stud career at the Dalham Hall Stud at Newmarket. He sired the winners of races worth more than £6M in prize money. His best winners included Street Cry, Almutawakel, Medicean, West Wind, Storming Home and Chic. Pensioned from stud duties in 2004 because of laminitis. Euthanized on 27 June 2004 due to laminitis.

Cultural references
Machiavellian was the subject of a painting by Mark Wallinger entitled Half-Brother (Exit to Nowhere – Machiavellian).

Pedigree

References

Racehorses bred in Kentucky
Racehorses trained in France
1987 racehorse births
2004 racehorse deaths
Thoroughbred family 2-d